The Young Nurses is a 1973 film directed by Clint Kimbrough. It was the fourth in the popular "nurses" cycle for New World Pictures, starting with The Student Nurses (1970).

Plot
Three sexy, female health care workers expose a drug ring that is operating from inside a big city hospital.

Cast
Jeane Manson as Kitty
Ashley Porter as Joanne
Angela Elayne Gibbs as Michelle
Zack Taylor as Donahue
Jack La Rue Jr. as Ben
William Joyce as Fairbanks
Allan Arbus as Krebs
Mary Doyle as Nurse Dockett
Sally Kirkland as Woman at Clinic
Don Keefer as Chemist
Dick Miller as Cop
Mantan Moreland as Old Man (as ‘Man Tan Moreland’)
Samuel Fuller as Doc Haskell

Critical reception
Critic Nathaniel Thompson wrote in his review for Turner Classic Movies that the film "feels more like an intended Pam Grier vehicle as Michelle (Cleopatra Jones' Angela Elayne Gibbs) juggles her time [...] between her nursing job and taking care of the drug dealers who are destroying her friends and neighborhood," and "the other storylines are far less interesting, with Kitty (Jeane Manson) and Joanne (Ashley Porter) getting a grip on a boat racing competition and the best way to wriggle out of their tight nurse uniforms." Writing in Slant, critic Budd Wilkins noted that director "Kimbrough brings a solid televisual style to the film, though the story’s nothing more than boilerplate," and "if you’ve ever wanted to see [actor] Fuller kneed in the nuts and then shanked with a syringe, here’s your chance."

See also
 List of American films of 1973

References

External links

1970s exploitation films
1973 films
American exploitation films
1970s English-language films
New World Pictures films
Medical-themed films
Films produced by Julie Corman
Films about nurses
1970s American films